My Sunny Maad (Czech: Moje slunce Mad), is a 2021 Czech-Slovak-French co-production animated film directed by Michaela Pavlátová.

Plot 
Herra, a young Czech woman, falls in love with Nazir, an Afghan man whom she eventually married, in a post-Taliban Afghanistan.

Accolades 
The feature was nominated for the Golden Globe Award for Best Animated Feature Film.

It also won the Cesar Award for Best Animated Film.

References

External links 

Conversation with the director about My Sunny Maad

2021 animated films
Czech animated films
Slovak animated films
French animated films
Czech animated drama films
2021 independent films